Brendan Patrick McHugh (born April 11, 1990) is an American swimmer who specializes in breaststroke events.  He is the former U.S. Open record holder in the 50 meters breaststroke (27.10) and the 2014 National Champion in that event. His time of 27.10 was the sixth (6th) fastest in the World for 2014. He is a two-time member of U.S.A. Swimming's National Team for the 100 meters breaststroke (2014–15, 2015–16) and represented the United States at the 2015 FINA World Championships in Kazan, Russia.

McHugh grew up in the Sicklerville neighborhood of Winslow Township, New Jersey and attended St. Augustine Preparatory School. 
  He led the Hermits to three Non-Public "A" State Championships (2005, 2007, and 2008), with the team amassing a 54–1 record during McHugh's four (4) years. McHugh also won the individual state title in the 100 breaststroke three times, as a sophomore (2006), junior (2007), and senior (2008).  At the University of Pennsylvania, McHugh was an All-American, multiple time Ivy League champion, and, at the time, the Ivy-League record holder in the 100 and 200 breaststrokes.  He turned professional while pursuing his J.D. degree at Washington and Lee University School of Law and is currently an attorney in Philadelphia.

References

External links
 https://web.archive.org/web/20160303230933/http://www.pennathletics.com/ViewArticle.dbml?ATCLID=1594798&
 http://articles.philly.com/2014-08-18/sports/52906020_1_law-student-national-record-law-school

1990 births
Living people
American male breaststroke swimmers
People from Winslow Township, New Jersey
Sportspeople from Camden County, New Jersey
St. Augustine Preparatory School alumni
University of Pennsylvania alumni